The 2011 German Athletics Championships were held at the Auestadion in Kassel on 23–24 July 2011.

Results

Men

Women

References 
 Results source:

External links 

 Official website of the German Athletics Championships 

2011
German Athletics Championships
German Athletics Championships
21st century in Kassel
Sport in Kassel